The Mayor of Orange, is the leader of the Council of the City of Orange, a local government area located in Orange, New South Wales, Australia. The official title of Mayors while holding office is: His/Her Worship The Mayor of Orange. First incorporated on 9 January 1860 as the Municipality of Orange, on 10 July 1946, the Municipality of Orange was proclaimed as the City of Orange. First meeting on 18 February 1860, the legality of the Constitution of the Orange Municipal Council was questioned in 1866 and was suspended by order of the Supreme Court of New South Wales. With the Municipalities Act 1867, the Council was reconstituted and a new council was elected on 14 February 1868. In 1888, the Municipality of East Orange was proclaimed and merged with the Orange Municipality on 24 December 1912.

The current Mayor of Orange is Councillor Reg Kidd.  A proposal to elect the mayor by a direct popular vote took effect at the 2017 Local Government Elections. The mayor will hold office until the next local government election, due in 2020.

Chairmen/Mayors of the Municipality of Orange 1860–1946

Mayors of the Municipality of East Orange 1888–1912

Mayors of the City of Orange 1946–present

References

External links
 City of Orange (Council website)

Orange
City of Orange